Amar Singh Majithia was a soldier and administrator during the Sikh Empire. He was born in Maan clan of Jats.

Biography
He was also called Amar Singh Kallan (senior) to distinguish him from Amar Singh Khurd (junior). Both Amar Singh Kallan and Khurd were from the village of Majitha. Amar Singh Majithia took part in many early campaigns under Ranjit Singh and was appointed governor of Hazara Division after Diwal Ram Dial's death by the Mashwani and Utmanzai tribesmen of Hazara. He was known to be an astute person and succeeded in winning over the leading men to his side, and in collecting the old Durani revenue and tribute from the Hazara plains. However, like his predecessor, Amar Singh Majithia was also killed in battle along with all of his men by the Karlal tribe. The scene of this battle was at the banks of Samundar katha stream, a tributary of the Harroh river.

References

Sikh Empire
Indian Sikhs
Sikh politics